Tseng Lan Shue is a village in Sai Kung District, New Territories, Hong Kong.

Location

Administration
Tseng Lan Shue is a recognized village under the New Territories Small House Policy.

History
At the time of the 1911 census, the population of Tseng Lan Shue was 276. The number of males was 124.

Buildings and amenities
The village has about 250 residential settlements and a basketball court. There are some shops on the roadside.

The house at No. 43 Tseng Lan Shue, built around the 1900s, has been listed as a Grade III historic building.

Education
Tseng Lan Shue is in Primary One Admission (POA) School Net 95. Within the school net are multiple aided schools (operated independently but funded with government money) and one government school: Tseung Kwan O Government Primary School (將軍澳官立小學).

Environment
A small river runs through the village. In 2007, a large snake, python reticulatus, was discovered in the river. Since this type of snake is considered endangered in Hong Kong, it was put in a wildlife conservation.

Public transport
Kowloon Motor Bus routes 91, 91M, 92, and several green minibuses and red minibuses serve the village at a nearby bus stop on Clear Water Bay Road. Services run along Clear Water Bay Road to/from Choi Hung station ( to the east) and beyond. Choi Hung is the most accessible station on the Hong Kong MTR to Tseng Lan Shue.

The village is one of the benchmarks for hikers on the Wilson Trail, which crosses the village. Clear Water Bay Road marks the separation between stage 3 and stage 4 of the Wilson Trail.

References

External links

 Delineation of area of existing village Tseng Lan Shue (Hang Hau) for election of resident representative (2019 to 2022)
 Antiquities Advisory Board. Historic Building Appraisal. No. 43 Tseng Lan Shue, Sai Kung Pictures

 

Villages in Sai Kung District, Hong Kong